Ophryastes is a genus of broad-nosed weevils in the family Curculionidae. There are at least 30 described species in Ophryastes.

Species

References

Further reading

 
 
 
 
 

Entiminae